Andrew Carnie (born April 19, 1969) is a Canadian professor of linguistics at the University of Arizona.  He is the author or coauthor of nine books and has papers published on formal syntactic theory and on linguistic aspects of Scottish Gaelic and Irish Gaelic. He was born in Calgary, Alberta. He is also a teacher of Balkan and international folk dance. In 2009, he was named as one of the Linguist List's Linguist of the Day. From 2010-2012, he has worked as the faculty director of the University of Arizona's Graduate Interdisciplinary Programs. In August 2012, he was appointed interim Dean of the graduate college. From 2013-2022, he worked as the Vice Provost for Graduate Education and Dean of the Graduate College. In that role he founded the University's Graduate Center, established the university's Graduate faculty, significantly increased student diversity, and worked to establish better working conditions and wages for students.

Linguistics

The bulk of Carnie's research has been in the fields of syntax, morphology, and phonology. He works primarily on the Celtic Languages, particularly Irish and Scottish Gaelic

Education

 B.A. (Hons) in Linguistics and Celtic Studies: The University of St. Michael's College at the University of Toronto, 1991
 Ph.D. in Linguistics and Philosophy: Massachusetts Institute of Technology, 1995

Books
 Proceedings of the 18th West Coast Conference on Formal Linguistics, Cascadilla Press, 1999 (with Sonya Bird, Jason Haugen, and Peter Norquest)
 The Syntax of Verb Initial Languages, Oxford University Press, 2000 (with Eithne Guilfoyle)
 Papers in Honor of Ken Hale (MITELF1), MITWPL, 2000 (with Eloise Jelinek and MaryAnn Willie)
 Syntax: A Generative Introduction, Blackwell Publishers, 2002
 Formal Approaches to Function: In honor of Eloise Jelinek, John Benjamins Publishers, 2003, (with Heidi Harley and MaryAnn Willie)
 Verb First: On the Syntax of Verb Initial Languages, John Benjamins Publishers, 2005, (with Heidi Harley and Sheila Dooley)
 Syntax: A Generative Introduction: Second Edition. Wiley-Blackwell, 2006
 Constituent Structure, Oxford University Press, 2008
 Irish Nouns, Oxford University Press, 2008
 Constituent Structure, 2nd Edition, Oxford University Press, 2010
 Modern Syntax: A Course Book, Cambridge University Press, 2011.
 Formal Approaches to Celtic Linguistics. Cambridge Scholars Press, 2011
 Syntax: A Generative Introduction: Third Edition. Wiley-Blackwell, 2013
 The Routledge Handbook of Syntax (editor), Routledge, 2014
 Syntax: A Generative Introduction: Fourth Edition. Wiley-Blackwell, 2021

References

External links
 Personal homepage

1969 births
Linguists from Canada
Celtic studies scholars
Living people
MIT School of Humanities, Arts, and Social Sciences alumni
People from Calgary
Syntacticians
University of Arizona faculty
University of Toronto alumni